(Octophony) is a 1991 octophonic electronic-music composition by Karlheinz Stockhausen. A component layer of act 2 of the opera , it may also be performed as an independent composition. It has a duration of 69 minutes.

Function in Dienstag
Oktophonie forms a layer of the music in act 2,  (Invasion—Explosion with Farewell). The very forceful nature of the electronic music required a technical solution in order that the instrumentalists, who perform at the same time, can always be heard. Stockhausen solved this problem by providing each player with a microphone and a transmitter for amplification, which allows them to move freely throughout the auditiorium. This became a central part of Stockhausen’s performance practice in subsequent parts of the Licht cycle.

Materials and technique

Oktophonie was realised in the Studio for Electronic Music of the Westdeutscher Rundfunk, Cologne, in two phases of work: from 23 August to 30 November 1990, and from 5 to 30 August 1991. Studio collaborators were recording engineers Volker Müller and Daniel Velasco-Schwarzenberger, and recording technician Gertrud Melcher. Production was made using a single 24-track tape recorder. A 64-track recorder would have been preferable, or alternatively three synchronisable 24-track recorders, but the WDR studio had only the one machine. Spatialisation was facilitated by the use of a QUEG (Quadrophonic Effect Generator), a device manufactured by EMS in the early 1970s. It was developed by Stockhausen in collaboration with Peter Zinovieff, owner of the firm at that time. Despite having only four outputs, the QUEG could still be used to produce an octophonic output, by manually switching to four outputs, not only between the square on the floor and the one on the ceiling, but between all six squares forming the sides of the cube. A number of synthesizers and modules were used in the production of the sound layers:
two Yamaha DX7II-FD synthesizers
two Casio FZ-1 samplers
a Roland D-50 synthesizer
an Oberheim Matrix-1000 synthesizer module (without keyboard)
an Art Proverb effects unit
a Roland SDE 2000 reverberation unit
an SVC 350 vocoder
an Atari 1040 St computer
C-Lab Unitor Hardware and Notator Software
a Yamaha MR 12/4/2 mixing console
In addition, an EMS Synthi 100 was used for control of the spatialization in some layers during the concluding portion.

Analysis
For technical reasons of playback the music had to be produced in two segments, with the second tape beginning at 36'23" and a "bridge" tape used only for performances of the second act of Dienstag.)

Performance history

1993: in the context of the staged world premiere of Dienstag, 28 May, Leipzig Opera
1994: World premiere of the electronic music alone, 12 June, at the restaurant of the Cologne-Deutz fairgrounds, organised by the Westdeutscher Rundfunk as part of the Kölner Trienniale)
1998: South American premiere, São Paulo, Brazil, at the International Festival of Electroacoustic Music of São Paulo (BIMESP), held 8–17 October)
2002: Neue Nationalgalerie at the Kulturforum, Berlin
2002: Stockhausen Courses, Kürten
2004: Sonorities Festival, Queen's University Belfast, Sonic Arts Research Centre, Belfast, Northern Ireland, Sunday 25 April
2005: Triptych Festival, Queen's Hall, Edinburgh, Saturday 30 April
2005: West Coast Festival of Numusic 2005, Tou Old Brewery, Stavanger, Norway, Friday 26 August
2005: Frieze Festival, Old Billingsgate Market, London, 25 October
2007: Stockhausen Courses, Kürten, 15 July
2008: Fromm Players at Harvard: 60 Years of Electronic Music, 8 March
2008: Stockhausen Courses, Kürten, 7 July
2009: Durham University Musicon series, Music and Electronics, 19 March
2009: version with soloists (Signale zur Invasion with Ben Marks, trombone; Pietà with Tristram Williams, flugelhorn, and Jessica Aszodi, soprano; Synthi-Fou with Michael Fowler, electronic keyboards):
Turbine Hall, Brisbane Powerhouse, Brisbane, Australia, 25 April
Sydney Conservatorium of Music, as part of Smart Light Sydney Festival (a component of Vivid Sydney), Sydney Australia, Saturday, 6 June
2009: Stockhausen Courses, Kürten, 14 July
2010: Paris, 26 March, two performances, 4:00pm and 9:00pm, Atelier 4, 104 rue d'Aubervilliers
2011: Version with soloists (Signale zur Invasion with Andrew Digby, trombone; Pietà with Marco Blaauw, flugelhorn, and Agata Zubel, soprano; Synthi-Fou with Antonio Pérez-Abellán, electronic keyboards), sound projection: Kathinka Pasveer. Stockhausen Courses, Sülztalhalle, Kürten, 9 August
2013: Park Avenue Armory, 9 performances, sound projection: Kathinka Pasveer; design: Rirkrit Tiravanija)

Discography
 Stockhausen: Oktophonie. Stockhausen Complete Edition CD 41. Kürten: Stockhausen-Verlag, 1994.
 Stockhausen: Dienstag aus Licht. Annette Meriweather (soprano); Julian Pike (tenor); Nicholas Isherwood (bass); Markus Stockhausen (trumpet and flugelhorn); Michael Svoboda (trombone); Massimiliano Viel, Simon Stockhausen (synthesizers); Andreas Boettger, Renee Jonker (percussion); WDR Choir, Karlheinz Stockhausen (cond.). Stockhausen Complete Edition CD 40A–B. Kürten: Stockhausen-Verlag, 1996.
 Stockhausen: Solo-Synthi-Fou; Synthi-Fou; Dienstags-Abschied; Klangfarben für Synthi-Fou. Simon Stockhausen (synthesizers); WDR Choir, Karlheinz Stockhausen (cond.). Stockhausen Complete Edition CD 42 A–B. Kürten: Stockhausen-Verlag, 1994.
 Stockhausen: Michaels-Ruf; Bassettsu; Synthi-Fou; Quitt; Komet; Trompetent. Stockhausen Complete Edition CD 82. Kürten: Stockhausen-Verlag, 2007.

References

Cited sources

Further reading

 Clarke, Michael, and Peter Manning. 2008. "The Influence of Technology on the Composition of Stockhausen's Octophonie [sic], with Particular Reference to the Issues of Spatialisation in a Three-Dimensional Listening Environment". Organised Sound 13, no. 3 (December): 177–187. 
 Clarke, J. M., and Peter Manning. 2009. "Valuing Our Heritage: Exploring Spatialisation through Software Emulation of Stockhausen's Oktophonie". In Proceedings of the International Computer Music Conference (ICMC 2009), Montreal, Canada, 179–182. [N.p.]: International Computer Music Association.
 Frisius, Rudolf. 2013. Karlheinz Stockhausen III: Die Werkzyklen 1977–2007. Mainz, London, Berlin, Madrid, New York, Paris, Prague, Tokyo, Toronto: Schott Music. .
 Kohl, Jerome. 2004. "Der Aspekt der Harmonik in Licht". In Internationales Stockhausen-Symposion 2000: LICHT. Musikwissenschaftliches Institut der Universität zu Köln, 19. bis 22. Oktober 2000. Tagungsbericht, edited by Imke Misch and Christoph von Blumröder, 116–136. Signale aus Köln 10. Münster: Lit-Verlag. .
 Maconie, Robin. 2005. Other Planets: The Music of Karlheinz Stockhausen. Lanham, Maryland, Toronto, Oxford: Scarecrow Press. .
 Miller, Paul. 2009. "Stockhausen and the Serial Shaping of Space". Ph.D. dissertation. Rochester: University of Rochester, Eastman School of Music.
 Overholt, Sara Ann. 2006. "Karlheinz Stockhausen's Spatial Theories: Analyses of Gruppen für drei Orchester and Oktophonie, Electronische  Musik vom Dienstag aus LICHT". Ph.D. dissertation. Santa Barbara: University of California at Santa Barbara.
 Ulrich, Thomas. 2017. Stockhausens Zyklus LICHT: Ein Opernführer. Cologne, Weimar, and Vienna: Böhlau Verlag. .
 Schwerdtfeger, Dettloff. 1999. "Die Tempo- und Dauernproportionen der Superformel für LICHT". In Internationales Stockhausen-Symposion 1998: Musikwissenschaftliches Institut der Universität zu Köln 11. bis 14. November 1998: Tagungsbericht, edited by Imke Misch and Christoph von Blumröder, 227–234. Signale aus Köln 4. Saarbrücken: Pfau-Verlag. 3-89727-050-1.
 Stockhausen, Karlheinz, Pay-Uun Hiu, and Alcedo Coenen. 2008. "'Der differenziertere Mensch ist der akustische Mensch': Karlheinz Stockhausen im Gespräch über Oktophonie". , no. 116 (February): 53–63.

Compositions by Karlheinz Stockhausen
1991 compositions
Spatial music
Electronic compositions